Lars Roverud (19 December 1776 – 26 February 1850) was a Norwegian musician and music teacher, among others at Asker Seminary and the Practical-Theological Seminary. He played a prominent role in popularising the psalmodikon, a one-string bowed instrument, for musical education and church music in Norway.

References

1776 births
1850 deaths
Norwegian musicians
Norwegian schoolteachers